The 2014–15 Hartford Hawks women's basketball team will represent the University of Hartford in the America East Conference. The Hawks were led by sixteenth year Women's Basketball Hall of Fame head coach Jennifer Rizzotti and will once again play their home games in the Chase Arena at Reich Family Pavilion. They finished the season 16-17, 8-8 in America East play for a fifth-place finish. They advance to the championship game of the 2015 America East women's basketball tournament which they lost to Albany.

Media
All home games and conference road games will stream on either ESPN3 or AmericaEast.tv. Most road games will stream on the opponents website. All games will be broadcast on the radio on WWUH.

Roster

Schedule

|-
!colspan=9 style=| Non-conference regular season

|-
!colspan=9 style="background:#; color:#FFFFFF;"| America East Women's Tournament

See also
2014–15 Hartford Hawks men's basketball team
Hartford Hawks women's basketball

References

Hartford
Hartford Hawks women's basketball seasons
Hartford Hawks
Hartford Hawks